San Felipe Hills  may refer to:

 San Felipe Hills (Santa Clara County), California, USA 
 San Felipe Hills (San Diego County), California, USA

See also
 List of mountain ranges of California

Hills of California